Edward Backus may refer to:

 Edward Wellington Backus (1861–1934), businessman in Minnesota
 Edward Burdette Backus (1888–1955), American Unitarian minister and humanist